Johnny Sullivan (19 December 1932 – 4 February 2003) was an English professional middle/light heavyweight boxer of the 1940s, '50s and '60s who won the British Boxing Board of Control (BBBofC) British middleweight title, and British Empire middleweight title, his professional fighting weight varied from , i.e. middleweight to , i.e. light heavyweight.

References

External links

Image - Johnny Sullivan
Image - Johnny Sullivan (Left To Right; Johnny Sullivan, Barney Ross, Robin Roberts, and Ralph Tribuani)

1932 births
2003 deaths
English male boxers
Light-heavyweight boxers
Middleweight boxers
Sportspeople from Preston, Lancashire
Place of birth missing
Place of death missing